Asur is a 2020 Indian Bengali-language romantic action thriller film written and directed by Pavel Bhattacharjee. According to the director, it is a tribute to the sculptor Ramkinkar Baij, but the backdrop is set from the 2015 Deshopriyo Park Durga Pujo, which made us visualize world's first ever largest Durga Idol. Originally set to release in December 2019, the film was released on 3 January 2020.

Plot

Kigan is an artist who is very passionate about his arts and works. He is always immersed in his own pool of thoughts and does not care about surroundings. Kigan is frequently suspended from his job as a professor of art due to his unusual activities in the class like consuming alcohol in the class etc. He is eventually fired from his job for doing scandalous photo shoots of an unknown rickshaw puller with one of his female students in college. But instead of being depressed for losing job, he is now very much happy for being an independent artist who is his own's owner.

Kigan starts to visualise Devi Durga as a young girl, who always accompanies him in his works. Gradually Kigan develops a love and care towards that young girl. Kigan plans to create something historical, majestic, immortal centring Durga. So he calls up Aditi (played by Nusrat Jahan) who is his friend and also has an affection towards him. She and Kigan were students of same art college. Kigan tells Aditi that he wants to create world's largest Durga idol at Deshbandhu park where Aditi's father (played by Biplab) is a patron. Aditi agrees and arranges a meeting between Kigan and the committee. They mock Kigan at first but later agree for the project after seeing a demo of the idol done by Kigan in a tennis court.

The puja committee previously worked with a large corporate company as sponsor, which is run by Bodhi who is a friend of Kigan and husband of Aditi. Bodhi agrees to work with them at a condition that, they have to remove Kigan as the maker but Aditi's father disagrees to remove Kigan, so they work with a new company. The new company makes terrific marketing of the puja through ads, banners etc. So people become very enthusiastic about the puja. Meanwhile, Bodhi is very much depressed as Kigan's creation becomes very popular among people and beats any other puja pandal in terms of crowd. Bodhi plans to demolish Deshbandhu park's puja and take revenge against Kigan

One morning Bodhi reaches the site and meets his old friend Kigan. Bodhi appreciates Kigan's work but tells him that the idol would be no more open as it would be destroyed by Bodhi. Kigan thinks that Bodhi is just joking and tells him that if he can destroy it then he can proceed but the idol will remain as long as Kigan is alive. Bodhi just smiles and goes away.

Meanwhile, the puja committee organises a party where Aditi's father introduces Kigan to other guests as Aditi's future husband. Aditi also agrees but Kigan creates a mess by mocking Aditi's father there. He tells he only loves Aditi as a friend and doesn't want to marry her as according to Kigan, Bodhi is the perfect husband for her already. Aditi's father feels embarrassed and suffers a cerebral attack after which he becomes paralyzed. Now Aditi turns against Kigan and thinks that Kigan is responsible for his father's condition.

Meanwhile, Kigan's pandal attracts crowds. Bodhi makes plans to create fake bomb blasts in the puja campus and create a mess. According to his plans a terrible mess occurs at the pandal, several people are stampeded. Bodhi even pays the media to cover this incident exclusively and promote it more seriously than the actual incident, eventually the police authorities ban the puja and order for the dismantle of the idol after puja. Kigan is put into jail for quarrelling with police. Later Bodhi releases Kigan from jail and on way to home he explains Kigan that he took his revenge by getting the puja banned from public. Kigan requests Bodhi to open the puja after 2–3 days but Bodhi disagrees. Kigan then challenges Bodhi that he would reopen the puja till immersion. Meanwhile, Kigan owns up to his mistakes to Aditi and they get reunited again. Next day Kigan investigates that only two persons were injured not many and it was a paid fake news. Kigan has meetings with police commissioner, governor regarding reopening of the puja but everywhere he gets negative response. Out of utter depression Kigan goes to Bodhi's house, determined that Bodhi is responsible for all this and he would kill Bodhi. Kigan and Bodhi have a fight where Kigan is about to kill Bodhi but then Bodhi's son attacks Kigan with a bat and Kigan falls. Bodhi scolds his son for hitting an elder person but Kigan supports him. Then Bodhi tells that he doesn't want to make his son like Kigan, so he will teach him proper manners. Here Bodhi discloses that his son is not his but actually Kigan's and he has tendered him as his own child and always has been a good father because he wants to make him a gentleman and an not as irresponsible as Kigan. Bodhi also discloses that Aditi has always been loving Kigan though Bodhi has always been a good husband. Even though he has brought up Kigan's child as his own child, Aditi has never developed any feeling towards him so he decided to finish Kigan who has destroyed his own family for that he has also destroyed his masterpiece creation. Bodhi repents that he is the Asur (villain) and begs pardon from Kigan. Bodhi also discloses that he is not the only one associated with this planning but Aditi is also responsible for this. Aditi thought of taking revenge from Kigan after her father's incident so she had been involved in this case.

Kigan is completely devastated by listening all this. He thinks that he had been responsible for all this. His work was pious but he forgot all the relationships for his art. So he leaves the place by telling that he is leaving for Nevada where he would stay undisturbed.

Meanwhile, Kigan comes to Aditi and questions her about her deeds. Aditi tells that she had done everything for Kigan more than any friend, but Kigan refused her love, he didn't thought of her. So she decided to go against Kigan. But she realised that she had done everything wrong and they can start a new beginning where Kigan, Bodhi and she would live together happily. Kigan can build his idol again in the next puja. But Kigan was desolated and he says that some things cannot be built again and he belongs to the tribe of Asur where yes means yes and no means no. After that he leaves that place.

Bodhi's son finds out that in Nevada there is a particular ritual of burning of idols by the artists himself. This information strikes Bodhi and he quickly visits Deshbandhu park's puja pandal along with Aditi. But by that time Kigan has set the pandal on fire along with himself. He promises durga that their story will remain forever though the idol will be destroyed. Kigan dies but after some time heavy rain saves the pandal from burning completely and the statue is saved.

The governor in Kigan's memorial service announces that Kigan's work would be preserved forever and would be a landmark of dedication towards art. In the last scene it is seen that Bodhi and Aditi has been reunited and they are watching the statue which is being carried away by a helicopter and Bodhi's son is seen to be playing with Kigan's measuring tape and dreams to be an artist. The story questions that who is actually the Asur (villain)? As from one angle Bodhi is correct and has specific reasons for going against his dearest friend Kigan. In other angle Kigan is the villain as he had been a failure in understanding real life relationships and had always indulged himself in his arts.

Cast
 Jeet as Kigan Mandi
 Abir Chatterjee as Bodhisattva aka Bodhi
 Nusrat Jahan as Aditi
 Rajnandini Paul as Durga (Kigan's Illusion)
 Biplab Chatterjee as Aditi's father
 Kushal Chakraborty as Biva Da
 Bikram Ghosh in a special appearance
 Biswarup Biswas as Police Commissioner
 Biswajit Chakrobarty as Governor Abhijeet Sengupta
 Gora Dhar
 Nanak Madnani
 Trambak Roy Chowdhury as Bodhi's henchman
 Raj as Bodhi's henchman
 Ambarish Bhattacharya in a special appearance

Soundtrack 
The film score was composed by Bickram Ghosh while songs were composed by Bickram Ghosh & Amit Mitra with lyrics written by Sugato Guha & Dipankar Ghosh. The vocals were provided by Mohammed Irfan, Timir Biswas, Iman Chakraborty, Shovan Ganguly, and Ujjaini Mukherjee.

Release 
The film was released on 3 January 2020. The film was Hit at the box-office with Indian box-office collection 7 crores.

Accolades 
 Films and Frames Digital Film Awards for Best Popular Actor- Jeet (refused the award).
 West Bengal Film Journalists' Association Awards for Best Actor In A Negative Role - Abir Chatterjee
 West Bengal Film Journalists' Association Awards for Best Art Director- Ananda Addhya
 West Bengal Film Journalists' Association Awards for Best Make-up- Manjeet Tiwari

References

External links
 

2020 films
Indian thriller drama films
Bengali-language Indian films
2020s Bengali-language films
2020 thriller drama films
Films directed by Pavel